The Cooper T38, also known as the Cooper-Jaguar, is a lightweight sports car designed and developed by Cooper Cars for motor racing in 1955. It was entered in the 1955 24 Hours of Le Mans, being driven by Peter Whitehead and Graham Whitehead, but retired after only 3–4 hours due to engine problems and an oil leak. It did not score any wins in 1955, albeit with one podium at the end of the season. Between 1956 and 1962 it scored 9 wins and clinched 23 podium finishes, with six victories alone being achieved at the Silverstone and Goodwood Circuits.

References

Cars of England
1950s cars
Sports racing cars